Eric Berger may refer to:

Eric Berger (meteorologist) and space reporter
Eric Berger, character in American Desi
Eric Berger (engineer) for Willow Garage
Éric Berger (born 1969), French actor